Letovo School is a private non-profit co-educational boarding school in Letovo, Novomoskovskiy, Moscow, Russia. It opened in 2018 and is designed for 1000 students.

History
The school was founded by Russian billionaire Vadim Moshkovich.

The founders of the School, together with experts from McKinsey & Company, have been carrying out research and surveys in Moscow since 2006.

Academics 
The Letovo School concept is to combine the approaches of the leading schools in the UK, Singapore, the United States and Russia. 

The school offers a national diploma and a certificate from the International Baccalaureate Diploma Program. Subjects offered include biology, chemistry, computer science, economics, geography, history, mathematics, physics, psychology, English literature, Russian literature, and visual arts. Languages offered include English, German, Latin, and Spanish.

Teaching at Letovo School is conducted in both Russian and English. Every student has their own individual education plan, consisting of compulsory subjects and elective courses. Furthermore, the school helps students develop the key skills for contemporary life: critical thinking, creativity, communication and decision-making and several life-skills.

Tuition averages about $20,000 a year.

School staff
The Head of Letovo School is Mikhail Mokrinskiy, former principal of Moscow school 57, which was consistently ranked number one in Moscow (under his aegis). Mikhail Mokrinskiy will be assisted by a Council of Experts, consisting of:
 Lai Cheng Lim (Singapore), Principal (academic) at Raffles Institution, 2007–2013.
 Ralph Townsend  (UK), Principal at Winchester College, 2005–2016. 
 Bradford Gioia (USA), Principal at Montgomery Bell Academy, 1994–2016.
Teaching at Letovo School is carried out by 150-200 Russian and international teachers. Four areas of Teacher's training and professional development have been developed specifically for Letovo School Teachers. “Teaching and education” with a focus on mind development, “Integrating modern educational technologies”, “Introduction to the International Baccalaureate”  and finally “Creating a secondary school educational programme” consisting of collaborative workshops and action research in the classroom.

Campus
Letovo School is placed on a 20-hectare-site in Moscow Region. Its construction was out by Dutch architects Atelier PRO.
The campus consists of the main school building, ten boarding houses for 500 students, three houses with apartments for teachers, a stadium and a range of sports and recreational grounds on site. Letovo School also owns a forest allotment, which will be used for ecological projects.

References

External links
Letovo school

Boarding_schools_in_Russia
Schools in Russia